Elwyn Moody "Wynn" Chamberlain, (19 May 1927 – 27 November 2014), was an American artist , film maker and author. Described by The New York Times as a "pioneer realist painter", Chamberlain has two works, Interior: Late August (1955) and The Barricade (1958), on permanent exhibition in the Smithsonian American Art Museum.

Early life
Elwyn Chamberlain was born in Minneapolis, Minnesota, in 1927. After serving in the US Navy from 1944 to 1946, he studied art at the University of Idaho, where he graduated with a bachelor's degree in 1949. He then took a master's degree in philosophy at the University of Wisconsin, while continuing to paint and studying with the Magic realist artist, John Wilde.

Art career
He had his first solo exhibition in Milwaukee in 1951, and three years later he had his first New York City solo exhibition at the Edwin Hewitt Gallery. Throughout the 1950s and 1960s his realist landscapes, interior scenes, and allegorical paintings were exhibited throughout the United States and in Europe. Although his work tended to become more abstract in the 1960s, he had a major exhibition of nude portraits at the Fischbach Gallery in 1965. The portraits were of New York literary and artistic figures of the time. One of the most famous of these is Poets Dressed and Undressed, two panels portraying Joe Brainard, Frank O'Hara, Joe LeSueur and Frank Lima. The exhibition also included a nude portrait of Allen Ginsberg who wrote the publicity flyer for the exhibition (Chamberlain's "Nakeds") as well as notes for the catalogue, wherein he equated Chamberlain's nudes with the ecstatic poetry of William Blake.

In the 1960s Chamberlain also became involved in Andy Warhol's circle. In the latter part of that decade he increasingly turned from painting to film and theatre.  In 1967 he produced the premiere of Charles Ludlam's Conquest of the Universe at the Bouwerie Lane Theatre, directed by John Vaccaro and starring several members of Andy Warhol's Factory, including Taylor Mead and Ultra Violet. Chamberlain also wrote, produced and directed the film Brand X which premiered in 1970. The film, a satire on American television commercials, included Taylor Mead, Candy Darling, Abbie Hoffman, Baby Jane Holzer and Sam Shepard in the cast.

On 7 September 1965, in Staatsburg, New York, Chamberlain married Sally Stokes, the former wife of John Sergeant Cram III and a daughter of Frederick Hallock Stokes. The couple had two children in 1968, fraternal twins Sara Ninigret Stokes Chamberlain and Samuel Wyandance Stokes Chamberlain.

Later life
In 1970, Chamberlain left the underground scene and the art world behind. He burned his paintings and left for India with his wife and children. The family were to live there for five years – in the Terai with a Tantric yogi, in the village of Kollur in Karnataka, and in Bangalore, in an old colonial mansion once owned by Arthur Wellesley. On their return to the United States in 1975, they bought land in California's Mendocino County, lived in a tent for three years, built their house and grew most of their own food. It was during this time that Chamberlain became a novelist. His first novel, Gates of Fire, was published by Grove Press in 1978. Gates of Fire, like his third novel, Then Spoke the Thunder, is set in India.

 Chamberlain was living in Marrakech, Morocco.

Chamberlain died in New Delhi, India, of heart failure on 27 November 2014, at the age of 87.

Novels
Gates of Fire (1978) Grove Press,  (also published in Spanish as El guru (1979) Martínez Roca,  and in Dutch as Door een poort Van Vuur (1980) Omega)
Hound Dog (1984) North Atlantic Press 
Then Spoke the Thunder (1987) Grove Press (also published in French as La nuit tomba sur Kotagarth (1990) Laffont)
Paradise (2006) Kadmos Publishing

References

Sources
ANP QUARTERLY, Volume 2, Number 4 '222 Bowery: The Bunker' by Ethan Swan, 2010
American Federation of Arts, Who's Who in American Art, R. R. Bowker, 1959, p. 98.
Banes, Sally, Greenwich Village 1963: Avant-garde Performance and the Effervescent Body, Duke University Press, 1993, 
Chamberlain, Elwyn, "Boom Bangalore", Geographical, July 2000. Accessed via subscription 19 June 2009.
Chamberlain, Sally, "From Woodstock to Altamont: Sally Chamberlain says goodbye to 60s New York", Five Dials, No. 7, September 2009.
Chamberlain, Sally "Make Little Mistakes". Five Dials No. 13 July 2010
Cozzolino, Robert, In Memoriam: John Wilde (1919-2006), Wisconsin Visual Artists, 2006. Accessed 20 June 2009.
Cummings, Paul, A Dictionary of Contemporary American Artists, St. Martin's Press, 1971, p. 94.
Greenspun, Roger, Review: Brand X, New York Times, 19 May 1970. Accessed 19 June 2009.
Kadmos Publishing, Biography of Wynn Chamberlain. Accessed 19 June 2009.
McCarthy, David, "Social Nudism, Masculinity, and the Male Nude in the Work of William Theo Brown and Wynn Chamberlain in the 1960s", Archives of American Art Journal, Vol. 38, No. 1/2 (1998), pp. 28–38.  Accessed via subscription 19 June 2009.
Renfrue, Neff and Giorno, John, Love & Sleeze: Renfrue Neff Interviews John Giorno & Vice Versa, Smoke Signals, January–February 2009. Accessed 23 June 2009.
Smithsonian American Art Museum, Wynn Chamberlain (excerpt from Virginia M. Mecklenburg, Modern American Realism: The Sara Roby Foundation Collection, Smithsonian Institution Press for the National Museum of American Art, 1987). Accessed 19 June 2009.Spokane Daily Chronicle, "Minnesota Artist Shows Work at UI", 24 February 1949. Accessed 19 June 2009.
Smith, Michael, "Theatre Journal: Conquest of the Universe , The Village Voice, 30 November 1967, p. 33
Stix, Harriet, "From Artist's Life to Austerity", Los Angeles Times, 22 September 1978, Orange County Edition, p. C1. Accessed via subscription 19 June 2009.
Thorton, Gene, "Male Nudes: Photographs, Paintings and Statues", The New York Times, 11 November 1973, Section: AL, p. 179.

External links
Video interview with Wynn Chamberlain by Steven Watson, September 2001, on the official web site for Watson's book, Factory Made: Warhol and the Sixties''.
Elwyn Chamberlain, Paradise (2006), complete novel in electronic form with permission granted by the author for free download, on the official web site of Kadmos Publishing.
Background information on Chamberlain's 1970 film, Brand X, including a lengthy video interview with Chamberlain, on the web site of the UK film company, Surreal Films.

American artists
American filmmakers
American male writers
1927 births
2014 deaths
University of Idaho alumni
University of Wisconsin–Madison alumni